Club Sando Football Club is a football club from Trinidad and Tobago. The club are currently members of the TT Pro League and play at the Ato Boldon Stadium in Couva.

History
Established in 1991, the club spent most of its years in the National Super League. They applied to join the TT Pro League for the 2014–15 season after finishing as runners up in the National Super League in 2013–14, but were rejected. However, after winning the Super League in 2014–15, they were granted access as they were deemed financially stable to the TT Pro League and finished in a respectable 7th place. In the 2016–17 TT Pro League they improved to finish 5th and made it to the 2017 Trinidad and Tobago Pro Bowl semifinal.

Honours
National Super League
Champions 2014–15

References

Football clubs in Trinidad and Tobago
1991 establishments in Trinidad and Tobago
Association football clubs established in 1991